State Route 23 (abbreviated SR 23) is an east–west major arterial urban highway running from Bellevue Boulevard (U.S. Route 51) near downtown Memphis to Interstate 240 near Shelby Farms in Shelby County, Tennessee.

Route description 

SR 23 is a mix between a four-lane divided highway and a seven-lane urban highway (with center turn lane).  This highway is designated on maps as being a secondary state route from its eastern terminus to its junction with SR 277 (East Parkway).  At this junction, SR 23 becomes a primary state route all the way to its western terminus at US 51.  SR 23 is better known as Union Avenue from its junction with SR 57 (Poplar Avenue) to its western terminus with US 51.  Union Avenue continues beyond this terminus going toward downtown Memphis ending at Riverside Drive.  SR 23 from Poplar Avenue to I-240 is known as Walnut Grove Road.  According to data from TDOT, The SR 23 designation ends at I-240, however, Walnut Grove Road actually continues east through Shelby Farms.

Future

In 2008, Walnut Grove Road was widened from the interchange with I-240 to the Wolf River bridge.  The project, which included a new Single Point Urban Interchange with Humphreys Boulevard, was scheduled to be complete before December 1, 2008, but was finished eight months early. The improvements will be continued east of this project through Shelby Farms, including a connection to a proposed extension of Kirby-Whitten Parkway (aka Shelby Farms Parkway). This is expected to begin within the next year or so.

Major intersections

References

023
Transportation in Memphis, Tennessee
Transportation in Shelby County, Tennessee